In Chilean historiography, the Conservative Republic was a period of Chilean history that extended between 1826 and 1861, characterized by the hegemony of the conservative party, whose supporters were called pelucones. It began with the defeat of the pipiolos (Liberals) by the pelucones at the Battle of Lircay ending the Chilean Civil War of 1829–30 and concluded in 1861 with the election of the independent Jose Joaquin Perez as president, ending the hegemony of the conservative party.

See also
Diego Portales
War of the Confederation

References 

1830 establishments in Chile